Gakoura is a village and administrative center (chef-lieu) of the commune of Guidimakan Keri Kafo in the Cercle of Kayes in the Kayes Region of south-western Mali. The village lies on the north bank of the Senegal River.

References

Populated places in Kayes Region